Rape  is a form of sexual assault. Its original meaning was "to take by force".

Rape may also refer to:

Places
 Rape (county subdivision), a geographic unit in Sussex, England, United Kingdom

Arts, entertainment, and media

Films
 Rape (film), a 1971 Norwegian film by Anja Breien

Literature
 "Rape" (poem), by Adrienne Rich
 "Rape", a poem by Patti Smith in the book Witt
 Rape: The First Sourcebook for Women, a 1971 book by New York Radical Feminists

Music
 "Rape" (song), by Pharoahe Monch
 "Rape Me", a 1993 song by Nirvana from the album In Utero
 Raped aka The Raped, a punk band later better known as Cuddly Toys

Biology
 Rape, a culinary name for members of the genus Lophius (monkfish), deriving from Spanish
 Rapé, a group of smokeless tobacco products containing Nicotiana rustica, used in shamanic medicine in South America
 Rapeseed, or rape, a cultivated plant and oil source

See also